Sergei Pavlovich Pimenov (born 3 June 1969) is a former Russian professional footballer.

Club career
He made his professional debut in the Soviet Second League in 1990 for FC Druzhba Yoshkar-Ola. He played 3 games in the UEFA Cup 1994–95 for FC Tekstilshchik Kamyshin.

References

1969 births
Living people
Soviet footballers
Russian footballers
FC Fakel Voronezh players
Russian Premier League players
FC Spartak Vladikavkaz players
FC Tekstilshchik Kamyshin players
FC Luch Vladivostok players
FC Metallurg Lipetsk players
FC Kristall Smolensk players
Association football midfielders
FC Volga Ulyanovsk players